Heyrieux is a commune in the Isère department in southeastern France.

Population

Twin towns
Heyrieux is twinned with:

  Busnago, Italy, since 1999

See also
Communes of the Isère department

References

Communes of Isère
Isère communes articles needing translation from French Wikipedia